Trenwheal is a hamlet in the parish of Breage, Cornwall, England, United Kingdom, and southeast of Leedstown.

References

Hamlets in Cornwall